Astrothelium octoseptatum is a species of corticolous (bark-dwelling) lichen in the family Trypetheliaceae. Found in Brazil, it was formally described as a new species in 2016 by André Aptroot and Marcela Cáceres. The type specimen was collected by the authors in the Parque Natural Municipal de Porto Velho (Porto Velho, Rondônia), in a low-altitude rainforest. The ascomata are pear-shaped (pyriform) and typically occur in groups of two to five, usually immersed in the bark tissue. The lichen contains lichexanthone, a substance that causes the surface of the pseudostroma to glow yellow when lit with a high-wavelength UV light. The species epithet octoseptatum refers to the ascospores, which usually have eight septa that divide the spore into distinct compartments.

References

octoseptatum
Lichen species
Lichens described in 2016
Taxa named by André Aptroot
Taxa named by Marcela Cáceres
Lichens of North Brazil